The 1981–82 season was Stoke City's 75th season in the Football League and the 49th in the First Division.

In the Summer of 1981 Alan Durban quit as Stoke manager to take up the same position at Sunderland. His former assistant at Shrewsbury Town, Ritchie Barker was appointed as manager and despite a good start the team were involved in a relegation battle. The arrival of Sammy McIlroy from Manchester United helped Stoke to scrape to survival finishing two points away from the drop zone.

Season review

League
Alan Durban's ambitions were bigger than Stoke's and in the summer of 1981 he was tempted by Sunderland's cash to become their manager. Durban's former assistant at Shrewsbury Town, Ritchie Barker was appointed as manager at the Victoria Ground and he inherited a reasonable squad of players but he also knew that the club had financial problems, which to a certain extent were eased when for the first time players wore shirts with a sponsor's name across their chests, Ricoh. By this time Barker had sold Kevin Sheldon, Paul Johnson, Paul Richardson and Iain Munro.

The 1981–82 season saw the introduction of three points for a win and Stoke got their first trio of points on the opening day of the season away at Arsenal. This was followed by a 4–0 win at home against Coventry City. However results and performances declined and after picking up just four more wins by January Stoke found themselves in a fight against relegation. Youth team product Adrian Heath was fast becoming one of the most talked about midfielders in the division and so Barker allowed him to join Everton for a healthy £700,000. He brought in England international David Watson from Southampton for £50,000 to replace the ageing Denis Smith and Sammy McIlroy for £350,000. Mike Doyle left soon after Watson's arrival following an argument with Barker. Despite an upturn in the results in February Stoke managed just a point in their next nine matches. With Stoke looking destined for relegation McIlroy proved to be a calming influence and Stoke managed to survive by two points.

FA Cup
A poor crowd of 12,805 saw Norwich City beat Stoke 1–0 in the third round.

League Cup
Manchester City again knocked Stoke out of the League Cup at the second round this time on penalties.

Final league table

Results

Stoke's score comes first

Legend

Football League First Division

FA Cup

League Cup

Friendlies

Squad statistics

References

Stoke City F.C. seasons
Stoke